Ketyconus is a synonym of the subgenus Conus (Floraconus) Iredale, 1930 represented as Conus Linnaeus, 1758. These are sea snails, marine gastropod mollusks in the family Conidae, the cone snails and their allies.

Distinguishing characteristics
The Tucker & Tenorio 2009 taxonomy distinguishes Ketyconus from Conus in the following ways:

 Genus Conus sensu stricto Linnaeus, 1758
 Shell characters (living and fossil species)
The basic shell shape is conical to elongated conical, has a deep anal notch on the shoulder, a smooth periostracum and a small operculum. The shoulder of the shell is usually nodulose and the protoconch is usually multispiral. Markings often include the presence of tents except for black or white color variants, with the absence of spiral lines of minute tents and textile bars.
Radular tooth (not known for fossil species)
The radula has an elongated anterior section with serrations and a large exposed terminating cusp, a non-obvious waist, blade is either small or absent and has a short barb, and lacks a basal spur.
Geographical distribution
These species are found in the Indo-Pacific region.
Feeding habits
These species eat other gastropods including cones.

 Subgenus Ketyconus da Motta, 1991
Shell characters (living and fossil species)
The shell is turgid in shape with subangulate shoulders.  The protoconch is paucispiral.  The whorl tops are not concave, are ornamented with cords, and nodules are absent.  The anal notch is shallow, an anterior notch is absent, and a dentiform plait may be present.  The periostracum is smooth, and the operculum is moderate in size.
Radular tooth (not known for fossil species)
The anterior section of the radular tooth is substantially longer than the posterior section, and the blade is relatively short being less than one-third the length of the anterior section.   A basal spur is present, the barb is short.  The radular tooth has one or two rows of large serrations flanked by multiple rows of smaller serrations.
Geographical distribution
The only species in this genus is endemic to the South African region.
Feeding habits
These cone snails are presumed to be vermivorous, meaning that the cones prey on polychaete worms, based upon the radular tooth morphology.

Species list
This list of species is based on the information in the World Register of Marine Species (WoRMS) list. Species within the genus Ketyconus include:
 Ketyconus ardisiaceus (Kiener, 1850): synonym of Conus ardisiaceus Kiener, 1850
 Ketyconus tinianus (Hwass in Bruguière, 1792): synonym of  Conus tinianus Hwass in Bruguière, 1792

References

Further reading 
 Kohn A. A. (1992). Chronological Taxonomy of Conus, 1758-1840". Smithsonian Institution Press, Washington and London.
 Monteiro A. (ed.) (2007). The Cone Collector 1: 1-28.
 Berschauer D. (2010). Technology and the Fall of the Mono-Generic Family The Cone Collector 15: pp. 51-54
 Puillandre N., Meyer C.P., Bouchet P., and Olivera B.M. (2011), Genetic divergence and geographical variation in the deep-water Conus orbignyi complex (Mollusca: Conoidea)'', Zoologica Scripta 40(4) 350-363.

External links
 To World Register of Marine Species
  Gastropods.com: Conidae setting forth the genera recognized therein.

Conidae
Gastropod subgenera